The 2020 Football South Australia season was the 114th season of soccer in South Australia, and the eighth under the National Premier Leagues format.

All NPL and grassroots competitions were suspended for one month due to the impacts from the COVID-19 pandemic in Australia, effective 18 March to 14 April, and subsequently extended. Competitions were able to be resumed effective 25 June, subject to conditions. The South Australian season was temporarily suspended in mid-November for a minimum of two weeks, with the NPLSA in the middle of its finals series.

Men's Competitions

2020 National Premier Leagues South Australia

The 2020 National Premier Leagues South Australia was the eighth season of soccer under the competition format in South Australia. It is the first tier of South Australian soccer and the second tier of Australian soccer. Each team plays each other twice, resulting in 22 rounds. The season began on 21 February and was suspended from 14 March to 27 June, due to the COVID-19 pandemic in Australia, with the regular season resuming on 3 July, and further suspended on 17 November. The Premier was planned to compete in the 2020 National Premier Leagues finals series, however the competition was cancelled in July.

League table

Finals

2020 State League 1 South Australia

Similar to the previous year, promotion to the 2021 NPL is awarded to the Premiers (highest placed team during the regular season), as well as the Champions (winner of the Grand Final). The finals series was suspended on 17 November.

League table

Finals

2020 State League 2 South Australia

Similar to the previous year, promotion to the 2021 SL1 is awarded to the Premiers (highest placed team during the regular season), as well as the Champions (winner of the Grand Final). The finals series was suspended on 17 November.

League table

Finals

Women's Competitions

2020 Women's National Premier Leagues South Australia

The highest tier domestic football competition in South Australia for women was known for sponsorship reasons as the PS4 Women's National Premier League. This was the fifth season of the NPL format. The 8 teams played a double round-robin for a total of 14 games. After three months off due to the impacts from the COVID-19 pandemic, the season resumed on 26 June.

League table

Finals

Cup Competitions

2020 Federation Cup

The 2020 Football South Australia Federation Cup was scheduled to be the 107th running of the Federation Cup, the main soccer knockout competition in South Australia, however the competition was cancelled prior to the first round due to the COVID-19 Pandemic in Australia. The competition was set to run alongside the 2020 FFA Cup, however the competition was also cancelled.

References

2020 in Australian soccer
FFSA season, 2020
Football South Australia seasons